Sassi is both an Italian and Arab surname. Notable people with the surname include:
 Amos Sassi (born 1979), retired Israeli footballer
 Bruno Sassi (born 1970), American professional wrestler
 Ezzeddine Hadj Sassi (born 1962), retired Tunisian footballer
 Ferjani Sassi (born 1992), Tunisian footballer
 Franco Sassi (1912–1993), Italian painter, printmaker and engraver
 Giovanni Battista Sassi (1679–1762), Italian painter
 Jean Sassi (1917–2009), French Army colonel and intelligence service officer
 Ludovico Rusconi Sassi (1678–1736), Italian architect of the Rococo period 
 Mohamed Karim Sassi (born 1968), Tunisian triple jumper
 Moriz Sassi (1880–1967), Austrian ornithologist
 Nizar Sassi (born 1979), French detained in the naval base at Guantanamo Bay, Cuba
 Pietro Sassi (1834 -1905), Italian painter
 Sadok Sassi (born 1945), former Tunisian footballer
 Jorge Sassi (1947–2015), Argentine actor
 Yossi Sassi (born 1975), Israeli guitarist and music producer

Italian-language surnames